The Flood: A musical play (1962) is a short biblical drama by Igor Stravinsky on the story of Noah and the flood, originally conceived as a work for television. It contains singing, spoken dialogue, and ballet sequences. It is in Stravinsky's late, serial style.

The work was premiered in the United States on the CBS Television Network on 14 June  1962, a production conducted by Robert Craft and choreographed by George Balanchine. Dramatic actors participating in the work included Laurence Harvey (narrator), Sebastian Cabot (Noah), and Elsa Lanchester (Noah's wife, which Lanchester played with a Cockney accent). Robert Craft also conducted the first staged performance, by the Santa Fe Opera in New Mexico in 1962, and again in Hamburg on 30 April 1963.

Text
The narrative of The Flood juxtaposes the story of the Creation with that of Noah. The text was compiled by Robert Craft using material from Genesis and the York and Chester cycles of mystery plays. Excerpts from the Te Deum are sung by the chorus.

Scoring
The work is scored for tenor soloist (Lucifer/Satan), two bass soloists (God), several spoken parts (a narrator, Satan, Eve, Noah, a caller, Noah's wife, son of Noah), chorus (SAT) and a large orchestra of 3 flutes (3rd doubling piccolo), alto flute, 2 oboes, cor anglais, 2 clarinets, bass clarinet, contrabass clarinet, 2 bassoons, contrabassoon, 4 horns, 3 trumpets, 3 trombones (1st doubling alto trombone), tuba, timpani, bass drum, cymbals, xylorimba, 3 tom-toms, harp, celesta, piano and strings.

The Flood was published in 1963 by Boosey & Hawkes.

Structure
The work is in seven parts:

Recordings
 The original cast recording, with Robert Craft conducting (in the composer's presence) the Columbia Symphony Orchestra and Chorus, recorded in 1962 for Columbia Masterworks Records, released on CD by Sony Classical Records (SM2K 46300)
 Oliver Knussen conducting the London Sinfonietta on Deutsche Grammophon (DG 447 068-2, released 1995)

References

Cited sources
 Phillip Ramey: Liner notes to Igor Stravinsky Edition, vol. X: Oratorio and Melodrama (Sony Classical SM2K 46300)
 Boosey & Hawkes' information about the score. Retrieved August 16, 2007
Holman, J. K. (ed.) 2007. Wagner Moments: A Celebration of Favorite Wagner Experiences. New York: Amadeus Press. . Snippet view on Google books at books.google.com.
 Kuster, Andrew, Analysis of The Flood. Retrieved 5 May 2009.

Further reading
 
Straus,  Joseph. N. 2001. Stravinsky's Late MusicCambridge Studies in Music Theory and Analysis. Cambridge and New York: Cambridge University Press.  (cloth);  (pbk).
Stravinsky, Igor, and Robert Craft. 1962. Expositions and Developments. Garden City, NY: Doubleday; London: Faber and Faber. Reprinted, Berkeley and Los Angeles: University of California Press, 1981. .
van den Toorn, Peter C. 1983. The Music of Igor Stravinsky. Composers of the Twentieth Century. New Haven and London: Yale University Press. .
White, Eric Walter. 1979. Stravinsky: The Composer and His Works, second edition. Berkeley and Los Angeles: The University of California Press. .

Ballets by George Balanchine
Operas by Igor Stravinsky
1962 operas
Operas for television
English-language operas
Operas
Operas based on the Bible
Noah's Ark in popular culture